Roger Fernival Darvall Barton (30 July 1875 – 17 June 1957) was a rugby union player who represented Australia.

Barton, a flanker, was born in Bathurst, NSW and claimed international rugby cap for Australia. His debut game was against Great Britain, at Sydney, on 5 August 1899.

References

Australian rugby union players
Australia international rugby union players
1875 births
1957 deaths
Rugby union flankers
Rugby union players from New South Wales